This is a list of institutions of Higher education in India.

Universities
 List of universities in India
 List of autonomous higher education institutes in India
 List of central universities in India
 List of state universities in India
 List of deemed universities in India
 List of private universities in India

Academia Institution
The institutions also can be classified into different categories with different bases.
 
Type or area of interest: engineering, medical, management, law, agricultural, drama, fashion, etc.
Some classifications are listed below.

Institutions by states and union territories

North India
Chandigarh
Delhi
Haryana
Himachal Pradesh
Jammu and Kashmir
Punjab
Rajasthan
Uttar Pradesh
Uttarakhand

South India
Andhra Pradesh
Karnataka
Kerala
Puducherry
Tamil Nadu
Telangana

East India
Bihar
Jharkhand
Odisha
West Bengal

West India
Goa
Gujarat
Maharashtra

Central India
Chhattisgarh
Madhya Pradesh

Northeast India
Arunachal Pradesh
Assam
Manipur
Meghalaya
Mizoram
Nagaland
Sikkim
Tripura

Institutions by type

Arts and Science Colleges
Indian Institutes of Information Technology
Indian Institutes of Technology
Indian Institutes of Management
National Forensic Sciences University
National Institutes of Technology
National Law University
National Institute of Design (NIDs)
Indian Institutes of Science Education and Research
All India Institutes of Medical Sciences
National Institutes of Pharmaceutical Education and Research
Institute of Hotel Management
Indian Institute of Tourism and Travel Management
School of Planning and Architecture
Agricultural institutions
Ayurvedic colleges
Business schools
Drama schools
Economics schools
Islamic institutions
Law schools

Medical colleges
Aerospace Engineering schools
Dental colleges
Fashion schools
Film schools
Hospitality schools
Architecture schools
Journalism schools
Maritime colleges
Nursing schools
Optometry schools
Institutions of Music
Pharmacy schools
Veterinary medicine schools

Miscellaneous lists
Institutes of Eminence
Institutes of National Importance
List of Central Institutes in India
List of oldest universities in continuous operation in India
List of Indian engineering colleges before 1947
Women's universities and colleges

See also
Ministry of Human Resource Development of India (MHRD)
Department of Higher Education of MHRD
 Open access in India

References

External links 
 Ministry of Human Resource Development, Government of India
 University Grants Commission of India